The 1969 Pacific Coast International Open was a tennis tournament played on outdoor hard courts at the Berkeley Tennis Club in Berkeley, California in the United States. It was the 81st edition of the tournament and ran from September 29 through October 5, 1969. The prize money for the event was $25,000. Stan Smith won the singles title.

Finals

Singles
 Stan Smith defeated  Cliff Richey 6–2, 6–3

Doubles
 Thomaz Koch /  Stan Smith defeated  Terry Addison /  Ray Keldie 6–1, 6–3

References

1969
1969 in American tennis
1969 in sports in California
September 1969 sports events in the United States
October 1969 sports events in the United States